Murray de Vere Beauclerk, 14th Duke of St Albans,  (born 19 January 1939), styled Earl of Burford from 1964 until 1988, is an English duke.

Family
The only child (by his first wife) and eldest son of Charles Beauclerk, 13th Duke of St Albans, the 14th Duke descends from King Charles II and Nell Gwyn by their illegitimate son, Charles Beauclerk, 1st Duke of St Albans. He is also the senior representative of the De Vere family.

Career
Beauclerk attended Tonbridge School in Kent, before qualifying as a Chartered Accountant in 1962.

Since 1989, he has served as Governor-General of the Royal Stuart Society, and is also a Freeman of the City of London and Liveryman of the Drapers' Company.

Marriages and issue
Murray Beauclerk married three times. His first marriage was to Rosemary Frances Scoones, born in Romford, London, Middlesex, in October / December 1941, and the wedding was held on 31 January 1963. She was daughter of Francis Harold Scoones (West Ham, London, Middlesex, 26 January 1915 - September 2004) and wife (1940) Rose Frances E. Callis (Merthyr Tydfil, Mid Glamorgan, Wales, July / September 1909 - 1 March 2014).  They had two children: 
 Lady Emma Caroline de Vere Beauclerk (born 22 July 1963), married 1991 David Craig Shaw Smellie
 Charles Beauclerk, Earl of Burford (born 22 February 1965)

Beauclerk and Rosemary were divorced in 1974. Rosemary was subsequently married, in 1975, to Paul Pellew, 10th Viscount Exmouth, 9th Marquess of Olías (born Estoril, Cascais, 8 October 1940).

On 29 August 1974, very shortly after his first divorce, Beauclerk married Cynthia Theresa Mary (born on 23 March 1929, died 12 May 2002), daughter of Lt-Col. William James Holdsworth Howard, D.S.O., and former wife of the late Sir Anthony Robin Hooper, 2nd Baronet. They were divorced in 2001, without issue.

In 1988, Beauclerk's father died and he became the Duke of St Albans.

The Duke married his third and current wife, Gillian Anita Northam, on 14 December 2002 in London.

Arms

References

External links

 The House of Nell Gwyn: Fortunes of the Beauclerk Family, Donald Adamson (William Kimber, Ldn 1974)

 

1939 births
Living people
Beauclerk family (Murray)
People educated at Tonbridge School
British accountants
House of Stuart (Murray)
14th Duke
St Albans